Jahangir was the uncontested leader of the Aq Qoyunlu from 1444 to 1454, but afterwards fell into a dynastic struggle with his younger brother Uzun Hasan, who by 1457 had defeated him and assumed full power over the confederation. Jahangir later died in 1469.

References

Sources 
 
 
 
 
 

Aq Qoyunlu rulers
1469 deaths
15th-century monarchs in the Middle East
Leaders ousted by a coup